Choi Hyeon-ho (born 16 April 1976) is a South Korean handball player. He competed in the men's tournament at the 2000 Summer Olympics.

Filmography

Television show

References

External links
 

1976 births
Living people
South Korean male handball players
Olympic handball players of South Korea
Handball players at the 2000 Summer Olympics
Place of birth missing (living people)
Asian Games medalists in handball
Handball players at the 1998 Asian Games
Asian Games gold medalists for South Korea
Medalists at the 1998 Asian Games